Codington may refer to:
Codington County, South Dakota
USS Codington (AK-173)